Welcome Reality is the debut album by British dubstep group Nero. A concept album, it was released first in Ireland on 12 August 2011 and the rest of the world on 15 August 2011 except Australia and New Zealand where it was released on 19 August 2011 on Chase & Status's MTA Records. The album has sold 120,000 copies in the United States as of July 2015.

Critical response

Welcome Reality has received generally positive reviews. Spin gave the album a score of 7/10, and wrote, "Alana Watson gives Nero's robotic skronk a rare injection of humanity, and the U.K. producers are smart enough to build most of their debut full-length around her husky voice, skipping the sampled spasticity of Skrillex in favor of Daft Punk's melodic big beat, '80s-inspired electro, and stadium-sized mash-ups of squealing guitar and windy synths." Jeff Weiss, for the Los Angeles Times, found the album to be "As effective as it is predictable", stating "Welcome Reality will inevitably soundtrack thousands of summer and fall blowouts". The album was not well received by Clash, who stated that "Welcome Reality is so in your face and predictable it feels like the musical equivalent of a Michael Bay movie: loud, crass, periodically fun, but ultimately forgettable".

Track listing

Charts

Weekly charts

Year-end charts

Certifications

References

Nero (band) albums
2011 debut albums
Concept albums